West End Commercial Historic District is a national historic district located at Greenville, South Carolina. It encompasses 15 contributing buildings in Greenville's second "downtown." The commercial buildings primarily date from about 1880 to 1920, and include examples of Victorian commercial architecture.  Notable buildings include the American Bank, Alliance and Mills & McBayer Cotton Warehouses, Indian River Fruit Store, Pete's Place, Bacot's West End Drug Store/Stringer's Drug, Furman Lunch, and Greer Thompson Building.

It was added to the National Register of Historic Places in 1993, with a boundary increase in 1998.

See also 
 West End (Greenville, South Carolina)

References

Commercial buildings on the National Register of Historic Places in South Carolina
Historic districts on the National Register of Historic Places in South Carolina
Victorian architecture in South Carolina
Historic districts in Greenville County, South Carolina
National Register of Historic Places in Greenville, South Carolina